Ruth Royce (February 6, 1893 – May 7, 1971) was an American vaudeville performer and silent film actress from Versailles, Missouri.

Career
Royce appeared in the serial, The Vanishing Dagger (1920), which starred Eddie Polo and C. Norman Hammond. In 1923, Royce, along with other Hollywood actors, participated in a vaudeville show at Universal City. Royce assisted Joe Bonomo with a Strong Man act.

She performed in a number of western movies over the years like California in '49 (1924), Warrior Gap (1925), Fort Frayne (1926), The Oregon Trail (1923), In the Days of Buffalo Bill (1922), Perils of the Yukon (1922), Rawhide (1926), Wolves of the Desert (1926), and Code of the Cow Country (1927). The latter was Royce's final film.

Ruth Royce died in Los Angeles, California on May 7, 1971.

Selected filmography
 The Girl in Number 29 (1920)
 The Vanishing Dagger (1920)
 Blue Streak McCoy (1920)
 'If Only' Jim (1920)
 The Man Trackers (1921)
 All Dolled Up (1921)
 Perils of the Yukon (1922)
 In the Days of Buffalo Bill (1922)
 Caught Bluffing (1922) 
 The Oregon Trail (1923)
 In the Days of Daniel Boone (1923)
 Beasts of Paradise (1923)
 Riders of the Plains (1924)
 The Empty Saddle (1925)
 Tonio, Son of the Sierras (1925)
 Officer 444 (1926)
 Rawhide (1926)
 Wolves of the Desert (1926)
 Fort Frayne (1926)
 The Gallant Fool (1926)
 Thunderbolt's Tracks (1927)

References

Los Angeles Times, Adds New Stars To His List, December 7, 1919, Page III17.
Los Angeles Times, Universal Players In Vaudeville, August 3, 1923, Page II9.

External links

 
 

American film actresses
American silent film actresses
People from Versailles, Missouri
Actresses from Missouri
Western (genre) film actresses
1893 births
1971 deaths
Vaudeville performers
20th-century American actresses